Joel Adrián Huiqui Andrade (born 18 February 1983) is a Mexican former professional footballer who played as a centre-back. His paternal surname is of Mayo origin (indigenous people of Sonora and Sinaloa).

Career
Joel Huiqui started his career in Hermosillo Hidalgo in the Primera Division 'A' which is the youth team of Cruz Azul, but debuted with C.F. Pachuca as a loan from Cruz Azul who did not debut him. He debuted in a game over CF Querétaro in a 0–0 tie in the 2003  Apertura. Playing two tournaments with Pachuca in a total of 38 games, he was later given back to Cruz Azul, where he earned a starting eleven position in 2004. Huiqui played in Mexico minor U-23 and for the senior Mexico national team, in the qualification for the 2006 FIFA World Cup. However, Mexican coach Ricardo La Volpe left Huiqui out of the 23 players who went to the 2006 World Cup. He had also captained the national team during 2013 CONCACAF Gold Cup.

He became infamous for an incident during the 2009 Liguilla semi-final against Morelia where he blatantly used his hand to prevent Wilson Tiago Mathías from scoring by tossing the ball away.  He later played for Monarcas Morelia.

On 26 January 2018 Huiqui moved to new United Soccer League team Las Vegas Lights FC with fellow Mexican Édgar Lugo.

Career statistics

International

International goals

Honours
Pachuca
Mexican Primera División: Apertura 2003

Cruz Azul
Copa Panamericana: 2007

Morelia
Copa MX: Apertura 2013
Supercopa MX: 2014

References

External links

 
 
 Huiqui's Statistics
 

1983 births
Living people
Mexico international footballers
Mexico under-20 international footballers
Cruz Azul footballers
C.F. Pachuca players
Atlético Morelia players
Cafetaleros de Chiapas footballers
Potros UAEM footballers
Las Vegas Lights FC players
Liga MX players
USL Championship players
Sportspeople from Los Mochis
Mexican people of indigenous peoples descent
2013 CONCACAF Gold Cup players
Footballers from Sinaloa
Association football central defenders
Mexican footballers
Mayo people